This is a list of electoral division results for the Australian 2010 federal election in the state of Victoria.

Overall

Results by division

Aston

Ballarat

Batman

Bendigo

Bruce

Calwell

Casey

Chisholm

Corangamite

Corio

Deakin

Dunkley

Flinders

Gellibrand

Gippsland

Goldstein

Gorton

Higgins

Holt

Hotham

Indi

Isaacs

Jagajaga

Kooyong

Lalor

La Trobe

Mallee

Maribyrnong

McEwen

McMillan

Melbourne

Melbourne Ports

Menzies

Murray

Scullin

Wannon

Wills

See also 
 2010 Australian federal election
 Results of the 2010 Australian federal election (House of Representatives)
 Post-election pendulum for the 2010 Australian federal election
 Members of the Australian House of Representatives, 2010–2013

References 

Victoria 2010